Al-Hamra is a Syrian village located in the Qalaat al-Madiq Subdistrict of the Suqaylabiyah District in Hama Governorate. According to the Syria Central Bureau of Statistics (CBS), al-Hamra had a population of 932 in the 2004 census.

References

Populated places in al-Suqaylabiyah District